
Gmina Skomlin is a rural gmina (administrative district) in Wieluń County, Łódź Voivodeship, in central Poland.

Villages
Gmina Skomlin contains the villages and settlements of Bojanów, Brzeziny, Kazimierz, Klasak Duży, Klasak Mały, Ług, Malinówka, Maręże, Skomlin, Smugi, Toplin, Walenczyzna, Wichernik, Wróblew, Wygoda, Zadole, Zbęk and Złota Góra.

Neighbouring gminas
Gmina Skomlin is bordered by the gminas of Biała, Gorzów Śląski, Łubnice, Mokrsko, Praszka and Wieluń.

References
Polish official population figures 2006

Skomlin
Wieluń County